A hinny is a domestic equine hybrid, the offspring of a male horse (a stallion) and a female donkey (a jenny). It is the reciprocal cross to the more common mule, which is the product of a male donkey (a jack) and a female horse (a mare). The hinny is distinct from the mule both in physiology and temperament as a consequence of genomic imprinting.

Description 

The hinny is the offspring of a stallion and a jenny or female donkey, and is thus the reciprocal cross to the more common mule foaled by a jack (male donkey) out of a mare. Like the mule, the hinny displays hybrid vigour (heterosis).

In general terms, in both these hybrids the foreparts and head of the animal are similar to those of the sire, while the hindparts and tail are more similar to those of the dam. A hinny is generally smaller than a mule, with shorter ears and a lighter head; the tail is tasselled like that of its donkey mother.

The distinct phenotypes of the hinny and the mule are partly attributable to genomic imprinting – an element of epigenetic inheritance. Hinnies and mules differ in temperament despite sharing nuclear genomes; this too is believed to be attributable to the action of imprinted genes.

Fertility, sterility and rarity 

According to most reports, hinnies are sterile and are not capable of reproduction. The male hinny can mate, but the emission is not fertile. Many have no sperm in the emission, others have sperm that is not motile. That said, there have been a handful of cases of female hinnies foaling. The dam of a foal carried to term in Henan Province of China in 1981 is variously reported to have been a mule or a hinny.
Also, like the mule, the hinny has 63 chromosomes, intermediate between the 64 of the horse and the 62 of the donkey. Because of this, it is difficult for these chromosomes to pair up properly.

See also 
Zebroid

References 

Equid hybrids

fi:Muuliaasi